The Allal al Fassi Dam is an embankment dam located  northeast of Sefrou on the Sebou River in the Fès-Meknès region of Morocco. Completed in 1991, it provides water for irrigation and hydroelectric power production. The dam was named after the famous Moroccan Allal al-Fassi.

Power station
Water reaches the power plant after being diverted by the Allal al Fassi Dam via an intake on the right bank of the reservoir. From the basin, water is sent through pipelines and finally penstocks to 3 x  Francis turbine-generators. Once used for power generation, the water is discharged into the Idriss I Reservoir. About  of water is transferred through the power station annually. The power station was commissioned in 1994 and generates  on average annually.

See also

 List of power stations in Morocco

References

Dams in Morocco
Hydroelectric power stations in Morocco
Embankment dams
Dams completed in 1991
Energy infrastructure completed in 1994
1991 establishments in Morocco
20th-century architecture in Morocco